Myriopteris parryi, formerly known as Cheilanthes parryi, is a species of lip fern known by the common name Parry's lip fern.

Description

Myriopteris parryi is a small tufted fern growing from a short creeping rhizome with medium brown scales, most with a darker thread-like mid-stripe. The leaf is usually 6-15 cm long (rarely up to 25 cm) and 1-3 cm wide. The leaf blades are oblong-lanceolate, twice pinnate, and densely wooly. The stipe (leaf stalk) is no more than 1 mm wide and has hairs that range in length, are bent, and are variably appressed to the stipe. Leaf segments are small, nearly round, and flat, with tangled hairs about 4 mm long densely on both surfaces. The adaxial (upper) leaf hairs are silver to white and the abaxial (lower) leaf hairs are tan to brown or golden. The pale hairs on top of the leaflets are often thick enough to make the plant look quite woolly from above. On the underside of the leaf the dark colored sporangia may be buried beneath the coating of hairs. Like many Myriopteris ferns, when conditions are dry the fronds may curl up with their abaxial surface exposed.

Range and Habitat
This fern is native to the Southwestern United States, California, and Baja California, where it grows in rocky crevices in the mountains and deserts.

Taxonomy
Based on plastid DNA sequence analysis, Myriopteris parryi is part of the lanosa clade in the Myriopteris genus, with Myriopteris rawsonii its closest analyzed relative.

References

Works cited

External links
Jepson Manual eFlora (TJM2) treatment of Myriopteris parryi''
Cheilanthes parryi — UC Photo gallery

parryi
Ferns of California
Ferns of Mexico
Flora of the California desert regions
Flora of Baja California
Flora of Nevada
Flora of Utah
Flora of the Great Basin
Flora of the Sonoran Deserts
Flora of Arizona
Natural history of the Colorado Desert
Natural history of the Mojave Desert
Natural history of the Peninsular Ranges
Ferns of the United States
Plants described in 1875